Opuntia caracassana is a species from the genus Opuntia. The species was originally described by Joseph zu Salm-Reifferscheidt-Dyck in 1850

Description 

Opuntia caracassana tends to erect up to 1 m in height. The flowers are yellow and the fruit small and red.

Juvenile 
Young specimens have obovate or round cladodes  between 5 and 12 cm long and up to 6 cm wide. The cladodes are also clearly green. The spines of the young specimens are subulate and white with a yellow base. The points are either dark or completely yellow. 1.0–4.0 cm long, Its spikes are described as divaricate. The spikes can have one to two radial spikes  1 to 1,5 cm long.

Adults 
Full-grown specimens have also obovate or round cladodes  grown up to 15–17 cm long and 10–12 cm wide. There are one to two white central spines with a brown tip which are  2.5-5.5 cm long. They are also described as being divaricated and subulate and with a white tip.  There are one to three radial spines which are 0.5-3.5 cm long. The longest spines tend the squirm.

Areole 
The areoles are white, rounded. Its dimensions are 3 to 4 mm white and 2 to 3 mm high. With some the Glochids are not clearly visible.

Flowers 
The flowers of the O. caracannana are 4.8 to 5 cm long. The perianth is 2.5 to 3 cm in diameter. The hypanthium is 3 cm in length.

Fruits 
Fruits of the O. caracannana  are small and red.

Distribution and habitat 
The distribution of the  O. caracannana ranges from the neotropical regions between the north of South America and the Caribbean and specimens have notably been observed in Aruba, Colombia, Curaçao and Dutch Caribbean, . Citizen science projects also mentions specimens being found in Costa Rica and Venezuela.

Taxonomy 
Opuntia caracassana  is also known by the following taxon names (synonyms):

 Opuntia pennellii
 Opuntia salvadorensis
 Opuntia wentiana

References

Taxa named by Joseph zu Salm-Reifferscheidt-Dyck
caracassana